Games and Culture is a peer-reviewed academic journal that covers the field of culture and media studies, specializing on the socio-cultural, political, and economic dimensions of gaming. The editor-in-chief is Tanya Krzywinska (Falmouth University). It was established in 2006 and is published by SAGE Publishing.

Abstracting and indexing
The journal is abstracted and indexed in:
Arts & Humanities Citation Index
Current Contents/Arts & Humanities
Current Contents/Social & Behavioral Sciences
Scopus
Social Sciences Citation Index
Sociological Abstracts
EBSCO
ProQuest
Social Sciences Citation Index

References

External links

SAGE Publishing academic journals
English-language journals
Media studies journals
Bimonthly journals
Publications established in 2006